Beef jerky is a type of jerky, a lean meat that has been trimmed of fat, cut into strips, and then dried to prevent spoilage.

Beef jerky or Beef Jerky may also refer to:
 "Beef Jerky" (instrumental), 1974 song from the John Lennon album Walls and Bridges
 "Beef Jerky", song from The Jerky Boys album The Jerky Boys
 "Beef Jerky", song from Cibo Matto album Viva! La Woman
 "Beef Jerky", song from Glen Campbell album The Big Bad Rock Guitar of Glen Campbell
 Beef Jerky, a character in an episode of Quack Pack